USCGC Point Swift (WPB-82312) was an  Point class cutter constructed at the Coast Guard Yard at Curtis Bay, Maryland in 1961 for use as a law enforcement and search and rescue patrol boat.

Design and construction details
Point Swift was built to accommodate an 8-man crew. She was powered by two  VT600 Cummins diesel main drive engines and had two five-bladed  propellers. The main drive engines were later replaced by  VT800 Cummins engines. After 1990 she was refit with  Caterpillar diesel main drive engines. Engine exhaust was ported through the transom rather than through a conventional stack and this permitted a 360-degree view from the bridge; a feature that was very useful in search and rescue work as well as a combat environment.

The design specifications for Point Swift included a steel hull for durability and an aluminum superstructure and longitudinally framed construction was used to save weight. Ease of operation with a small crew size was possible because of the non-manned main drive engine spaces. Controls and alarms located on the bridge allowed one man operation of the cutter thus eliminating a live engineer watch in the engine room. Because of design, four men could operate the cutter; however, the need for resting watchstanders brought the crew size to eight men for normal domestic service. The screws were designed for ease of replacement and could be changed without removing the cutter from the water. A clutch-in idle speed of three knots helped to conserve fuel on lengthy patrols and an eighteen knot maximum speed could get the cutter on scene quickly. Air-conditioned interior spaces were a part of the original design for the Point class cutter. Interior access to the deckhouse was through a watertight door on the starboard side aft of the deckhouse. The deckhouse contained the cabin for the officer-in-charge and the executive petty officer. The deckhouse also included a small arms locker, scuttlebutt, a small desk and head. Access to the lower deck and engine room was down a ladder. At the bottom of the ladder was the galley, mess and recreation deck. A watertight door at the front of the mess bulkhead led to the main crew quarters which was ten feet long and included six bunks that could be stowed, three bunks on each side. Forward of the bunks was the crew's head complete with a compact sink, shower and commode.

History
After delivery in 1961, Point Swift was assigned a homeport of St. Petersburg, Florida, where she served as a law enforcement and search and rescue patrol boat. On 22 June 1965 she provided firefighting assistance to the burning Irish MV Irish Poplar. On 11 September 1965 she assisted in the tow of disabled FV Carousel west of Tampa, Florida. Point Swift escorted the distressed FV Mistress to Clearwater, Florida on 19 November 1967. On 7 January 1968 she escorted the distressed Liberian MV Pochteca to Tampa Bay. On 21 September 1968, she rescued three from the pleasure craft Blue Star 30 miles south of Anclote Key, Florida. On 12 November she rescued two and salvaged equipment from MV Mystery II 40 miles west of St. Petersburg.

From 1969 to 1994 she was homeported at Clearwater Beach, Florida. On 4 February 1970, she stood by anchored barges that had been released by a tug due to steering problems. On 31 May 1987, Point Swift towed one of her sister ships, the disabled cutter  80 miles west of St. Petersburg to that port.

On 30 March 1995 Point Swift was decommissioned and stored at the Coast Guard Yard at Curtis Bay, Maryland. She was ultimately sunk as an artificial reef off Cape May, New Jersey 30 March 2000.

References

Bibliography

External links 
 "Point" Class 82-foot WPBs Coast Guard Historian's website

Swift
1960 ships
Ships built by the United States Coast Guard Yard
Ships sunk as artificial reefs
Shipwrecks of the New Jersey coast